The Saptak Annual Festival of Music is an annual thirteen-day Indian classical music festival held in Ahmedabad, India. It is organised by Saptak School of Music and takes place January first to the thirteenth every year, and is attended by hundreds of people.

History
The festival started in 1980 by Nandan Mehta and his wife Manju Mehta, Rupande Shah, Bharti Parikh and D.D. Trivedi, with the inauguration by Pandit Ravi Shankar and Pandit Kishan Maharaj. The one-day event in 1980 expanded to the performance of more than 130 musicians in 15 sessions spread across 13 days by 2010.

The festival features both emerging talents and established performers. Besides pure classical music, it also includes performances of folk music, classical dance forms, and semi-classical forms such as thumri.

Gallery
The gallery dedicated to the life of Nandan Mehta and the history of festival was opened in Ahmedabad in 2012.

See also

List of Indian classical music festivals

References

Music festivals established in 1980
Culture of Ahmedabad
Hindustani classical music festivals
Carnatic classical music festivals
Events in Ahmedabad